Mrs. Brown's Boys is a sitcom produced by BBC Scotland in partnership with BocPix and RTÉ, written by and starring Brendan O'Carroll. Originally a radio series starting in 1992, the series became more and more popular, which led to the television series debut on 1 January 2011.

There was another DVD series which was not shown on television, prior to the current television series.

The Brown Family

Agnes Brown

Agnes Loretta Brown is the protagonist and the loud-mouth matriarch in the BBC comedy series Mrs. Brown's Boys and the host of the 2017 BBC entertainment show All Round to Mrs Brown's.

Born in 1940, the mother of six children, the widow of Redser, and the carer of Grandad, she is known for her no-nonsense, somewhat rude, and colourful approach to the family and in the lives of her children, dealing with everything that goes on without the blink of an eye, however, karma seems to make up for her behaviour making her the subject of jokes, pranks, and mistakes that are a result of revenge, jealousy, or simply misfortune, causing much laughter to the audience and viewers, being nice is one of Agnes' weaknesses.

Agnes, along with Cathy, appears in the 2022 Netflix film A Madea Homecoming to attend the graduation party of her great-nephew Davi (whose grandfather was Redser's brother). The film's handling of the issue of Black Irish identity received positive press.

Grandad

Harold Brown, better known as Grandad, is the father of the late Redser and father-in-law to Agnes.

Grandad is fairly fit for his age, being able to walk without a stick and is seen very nearly running in one episode. He gets on well with the family; however, with Agnes, this is a different matter altogether. The two have a deep rivalry, and are sometimes quite horrible to each other, examples of which include: Agnes forcing Grandad to sing a Western song and hitting him with a tray, Grandad trapping Agnes behind the Christmas tree, Agnes trying to get rid of Grandad for two weeks and Grandad referring to her as "The Twat".

Despite their animosity to each other, Agnes and Grandad have been shown to genuinely care for each other, even if they conceal it very well. On Valentine's Day, Grandad gave flowers to Agnes and admitted that he thought his son was foolish for taking Agnes for granted. On another occasion, when Grandad was to go to the hospital for tests, Grandad admitted to Agnes that he was afraid, prompting Agnes to give him a pep talk to boost his spirits.

When the Brown children were growing up, Grandad played a small role in their lives. He would take them on a walk to the betting shop where he would spend the day. He still looks out for the children, but not as much. Bono enjoys playing (or in his view, tormenting) with him. Grandad has long white hair and is most often found in his armchair, sleeping. In World War II, he was part of the bomb squad. His wife's name has not been mentioned.

Grandad also features in All Round to Mrs. Brown's where he is normally seen sleeping in his chair whilst Agnes and Cathy interview guests. He was absent from Series 4 due to his portrayer Dermot O'Neill being unable to attend filming due to receiving treatment for cancer.

Mark Brown

Mark Brown is the eldest Brown child, the husband to Betty and the father to Bono.

Mark became the head of the family aged twenty-six, when his father suddenly died. He is the quietest too, often coaxed into things by his wife. He was born on his parents' wedding day; Agnes's water broke just after the couple said 'I do'. He was offered a promotion at work, but turned it down. The subsequent result was that Betty kicked him out and he turned up at his mother's house, depressed and tired. He turned down the job because, despite attending school for eight years and not even missing a single day, he did not learn to read or write. Agnes, feeling guilty, blamed herself until Cathy pointed out that if in eight years he failed to learn, it was the teachers fault. The problem is resolved when Betty says that she is determined to teach him.

Later on, there was no work going in the carpenter world, and Mark was made redundant. He and Betty had no other choice than to move from Finglas to Australia. Mark was reluctant to tell his mother, but Betty forced him to. Although putting on a brave face, it mortified Agnes, who sat silent for the rest of the day. The visas for the three came through, and Agnes found it even harder. However, Betty asked Cathy to print something at work for her. Cathy did so and soon, Mark found himself with more work than he could handle. The sheets that were photocopied turned out to be leaflets, which Betty posted through letterboxes. The family did not emigrate to Australia, and the couple let their son Bono – Agnes's favourite relative – break the good news.

Mark would have moved to England, if Trevor stayed at the Brown Residence instead of going to Africa.

Mark and Betty are much more well-off than the other family members.

Rory Brown

Rory Brown is the third son of the Brown family.

Rory Brown is the only homosexual in the family, a fact acknowledged by all of his family members except his mother, who seemed completely oblivious to the fact until she realises this with Cathy's intervention in "Mammy of the Groom". Rory is not married, up until the end of Season 3, when he marries fellow hairdresser Dino Doyle, in a private ceremony.

His sexuality is hinted at in "Mammy's Secret" when Rory tries to tell Agnes in Foley's; however, he is unable to do so. It is also hinted at later on in that episode when Agnes is having a discussion with Cathy and she says that Rory wants to tell her something, but is afraid that it will hurt her. This is also hinted at even more when the family is discussing who is coming to Dermot and Maria's wedding, when Rory said that he won't be bringing a girl. Rory was also apparently caught wearing his sister's communion dress when he was about 10.

Agnes is the only character not to know about his homosexuality up until "Mammy of the Groom" where she describes it as an illness. Until then, she was completely unaware of this and even Agnes' best friend, Winnie McGoogan, knew that Rory was homosexual.

Rory is one of two of Agnes's children to wear glasses, the other being Trevor.

Rory Cowan quit the role in July 2017 after 26 years of playing the character both on screen and in theatre, stating that he had not been happy for two years, although he did not state the reason behind it.

It was announced that the character would be replaced and would be revealed on the 2017 Christmas Day special. During the 2017 live tour for the November – December shows the role was played by other cast member Pat "Pepsi" Shields. Damien McKiernan was revealed to be the new Rory and made his first appearance during the 2017 Christmas Day special.

It was revealed in October 2020 that Rory had been written out of the programme, after McKiernan and fellow actor Gary Hollywood quit the show following a pay dispute. Rory's absence from the 2020 Christmas special is explained by Agnes telling viewers that he and Dino travelled to Wuhan to make their own brand of hairdryer and have not been able to get back home.

In the 2023 New Year Special, Agnes knew that Rory is becoming a taxi driver in China, while Dino is still styling people's hair.

Cathy Brown

Catherine "Cathy" Brown is Agnes' only daughter in the Brown family and the rudest child in the family.

She is a lonely middle-aged woman who is on the look-out for a man, but is put off by her mother and what her mother usually has to say about her boyfriends. In series one, it is revealed that Cathy has already been married once in a London register office, and the man she married was beating her – she is not divorced as of Series 1. Her past romances include: Teddy Brannigan, the local bad boy; Professor Thomas Clowne, her psychology teacher, and Mick, who is a police officer. It was revealed by Maria Brown that Mick was already married. It was revealed later in the series that Mick divorced his last wife. They then get back together. Cathy claims that he's more sensitive. Later in the series, when Cathy is expecting a surprise romance holiday to Venice, Mick States that he is going to Cork for work. Cathy is automatically suspicious and decides to take a walk by the airport. When she discovers Mick is there with a young woman, she decides to "tip customs off that they are drug smugglers." In the New Year's Day 2015 episode, Cathy leaves for a fertility clinic in London in the hope of becoming pregnant.

Cathy also appears in All Round to Mrs Brown's where she hosts a segment called "The Cathy Brown Show" where she and Agnes would interview celebrities.

The episode Orange Is The New Mammy states that Cathy's birthday is July 6 but in 'Mammy's Memories?' Buster states her birthday is February 29.

Cathy, along with Agnes, appears in the 2022 Netflix film A Madea Homecoming to attend Agnes' great-nephew Davi's graduation party.

Cathy is portrayed by O'Carroll's real-life wife, Jennifer Gibney.

Dermot Brown

Dermot Brown is the fourth child in the family, and the child that causes his mother the most worry out of anybody.

In his childhood, he attended a private school recommended by a judge, and it is there that he met his lifelong friend Buster Brady. He later met and proposed to Maria Nicholson, and the two married. Dermot gained a job as a promoter, a job which involves walking around the streets in various large and embarrassing costumes. Dermot and Maria had triplet sons, named after The Beatles: John, George and Ringo. Maria was initially against Dermot naming the children ("Your family doesn't have a great track record with names; you have a nephew named after a dog biscuit!"), but was soon swayed by his mostly normal names. The two love each other deeply, but Maria despises Buster, who regularly turns up with a criminal scam and tries to get Dermot involved.

Dermot was in prison when Mark married Betty and Buster was in prison.

In the 2021 Halloween special, Dermot is revealed to be 36 years old, as in the first episode, he was 33 and Agnes knew that.

Dermot is portrayed by Clyde Carroll in the original series and Paddy Houlihan (who originally played Trevor in the original series and a real-life friend of Danny O'Carroll) in the BBC series.

He is also married to Emily Regan, who plays the "Wash and Blow" trainee, Barbara and has two girls, who are twins.

Trevor Brown

Trevor Brown is the youngest and the kindest of the Brown children.

He was very nearly not home for one Christmas, despite spending 4 years on the missions, which was the longest period of time of him on the missions, much to Agnes's dismay (everyone else knew). However, in the middle of the party, Trevor walks through the door and Agnes bursts into tears, overjoyed. When he leaves for the missions in Series Two, he tells his mother that he doesn't want a big fuss like last time, his exact words being "no cake, no decorations, no brass band and please, Mammy, no tears". Agnes disobeys him and orders everything. Another Christmas time, Agnes is reading the letters her children sent to Father Christmas, and reads Trevor's. Trevor asks for his presents to be given to a poor boy with no toys.

Trevor has since appeared sporadically throughout the series. He appears for his brother Rory's wedding, and has a minor role in the movie, but is never a major character and all his traveling conflicts with his work on the missions. It was Father Quinn who helped Trevor get to the missions. He seems quite friendly with Quinn's replacement, Father Damien. When Agnes is trying to work out which of her children is gay, she rules out Trevor as he has taken a vow of celibacy.

Trevor also appears in All Round to Mrs Brown's where he along with Father Damien, hosts a segment called "Thought for the Day". In the second episode of Series 4, Trevor announced to Agnes that he wasn't returning to the missions after seeing what the world was like now and stated that if God had wanted him to stay, he would have given him a sign. Near the end of the episode, Trevor's faith was restored when he woke up and noticed "blood" markings on the palms of his hands, which he took as a sign from God. Unbeknownst to Trevor, Agnes had painted the markings on with red paint given to her by Betty.

Trevor is portrayed by Paddy Houlihan (who plays Dermot in the BBC series) in the original series and O'Carroll's real-life ex-son-in-law, Martin Delany, and was the real-life husband of Fiona O'Carroll (Maria Brown) in the BBC series, they broke up in December 2021. Martin is also one of the producers of the series, working for O'Carroll's own production company BOC-PIX.

Delany is from Australia and his voice is not a typical Irish accent.

Betty Brown

Elizabeth "Betty" Brown is Mark's wife, the daughter-in-law of Agnes and the mother of Bono.

Betty and Agnes have a love/hate relationship. Agnes likes her, but early on thinks that she is not good enough for Mark and is always willing to make a sly dig towards her. Betty has dyed blonde hair. Betty spends her nights at Foley's with Cathy, Maria, Agnes, and Winnie. Betty does not like snakes, even pythons.

When Mark, Betty, and Bono were thinking of moving to Australia, Betty was keener to move than her husband and son. She had already started packing before the visas arrived! However, upon seeing how much it would destroy Agnes if they did move, Betty wrote out some leaflets and asked Cathy to photocopy them at her workplace. Her idea worked, and soon Mark had more work than he could handle. Agnes and Betty have had a better relationship since then.

Betty can be rude to other people and can be impatient when she asks Agnes or anybody for anything.

However much Agnes and Betty may dislike each other, they have bonded on one occasion. When Hilary Nicholson started slagging off the family, Betty stood up to her and told Agnes that the Browns would be a better family than the Nicholsons any day.

Betty is portrayed by O'Carroll's real-life daughter-in-law, Amanda Woods, the real-life wife of Danny O'Carroll (Buster Brady) and mother of Jamie O'Carroll (Bono Brown).

Bono Brown

Bono Brown is the only child of Mark and Betty and the first grandchild to Agnes. He was named after Bono, the lead singer of the Irish rock band U2.

Bono appears sporadically throughout the show. Agnes often babysits him, and he enjoys playing games with (or taunting) Grandad. He loves his Granny and tells her everything, which sometimes drops other family members into trouble.

In the 2018 New Year special CSI: Mammy, it is revealed that Bono is 12 years old. The 2019 New Year special Mammy's Motel covers Bono's thirteenth birthday.

He would have been 16 at the time for the 2022 New Year Episode, but he did not appear in the episode.

Bono's most recent appearance was the 2022 Christmas Special.

Bono is portrayed by O'Carroll's real-life grandson Jamie O'Carroll, who is the real-life son of Amanda Woods (Betty Brown) and Danny O'Carroll (Buster Brady).

Maria Brown

Maria Brown (née Nicholson), born 1983, is the wife of Dermot and the mother of triplets John, George, and Ringo Brown (named after the Beatles, John Lennon, George Harrison, and Ringo Starr).

Maria's mother Hillary comes from England and Maria grew up in Ireland in her childhood, it is unknown if Maria is an only child or has siblings.

Maria comes from a wealthy family; her father Johnathan, is a solicitor. Her mother Hilary is a snob and dislikes Agnes intensely. Maria loves the family though, and she and Dermot live with Agnes until they find their own place. Maria was more desperate to find a house than Dermot was, as she did not enjoy the cramped atmosphere. She once stated that she wanted a divorce though this was most likely a lie so she could get out of telling Agnes that Rory and Dino got married in a private ceremony. A nurse by profession, Maria spends her nights at Foley's with Agnes, Winnie, Cathy, and Betty. She is not often seen with the triplets, so it is presumed that either Hilary or a paid babysitter watches them during the day.

Maria has appeared on almost every episode of the show, she did not appear in the 2022 New Year Special, Betty did not either.

Although several members of Maria's family have been mentioned throughout the series, none have actually appeared onscreen with the exception of her mother. Other family members include her cousin Bethany who, upon hearing that she was marrying Dermot, said "you aren't marrying that scumbag, are you?" and was bridesmaid at the wedding. Thomas Clowne, Cathy's former boyfriend, is a cousin of Maria's as mentioned in the original series and live tour.

Maria is portrayed by O'Carroll's real-life daughter Fiona O'Carroll, the real-life wife of Martin Delany (Trevor Brown), until their separation in December 2021.

Dino Doyle

Dino Doyle is the husband and fellow hairdresser of Rory Brown and the son-in-law of Agnes. He is from Scotland, and is portrayed by Gary Hollywood.

Dino and Rory work together at the Wash and Blow hair salon. Both are later promoted to co-managers of the salon. Dino was first introduced in The Last Wedding Part 1. Dino was a chef before a hairdresser which is why Rory recommended him in the first place. Agnes doesn't like Dino very much as, when he offered to use her new toilet to try to impress Hilary Nicholson, she saw that he was wearing a certain type of underwear (suspenders) that females wear. She then tells Rory that she thinks he is a "transtesticle" (transvestite).

In October 2020, after over 20 years working for O'Carroll, it was revealed that Gary Hollywood would be leaving the role after a pay dispute and finding out he would only be appearing in one of the programme's Christmas specials for that year. Dino's absence from the 2020 Christmas special is explained by Agnes telling viewers that he and Rory are stuck in Wuhan after travelling there to get their own brand of hairdryer made.

Redser Brown

Nicholas "Redser" Brown is the late husband of Agnes Brown and the father of the Brown children.

Redser and Agnes met at a birthday party, held for Sadie Brady. Redser was vomiting at the time; he said "give me a pint of anything" and they gave him Windolene. Agnes claims he died young leaving her with young kids, but he is also mentioned to have bought the family's dog, Spartacus (roughly 1996). In the original series, it is mentioned that he won her in a 'big willy contest'. Although it's never explicitly explained how he died, Agnes once joked that his last words were "Oh fuck, it's a bus!" He is also known to have been fond of drink and both his legs had been amputated on separate occasions. His full name was given as Nicholas in the movie Agnes Brown.

Redser appears as a ghost in the 2021 live Halloween special where he is shown to strongly resemble his eldest son Mark. It is revealed that Redser was not a good husband and father. It was believed that only Agnes could see him, only for it to be revealed near the end of the special that he could also seen by Grandad, who berates him for his attitude in life before punching him and telling him not to come back.

Unseen TV characters

Terry Brown

Terry Brown is the brother of Redser and paternal uncle to the Brown children. In Series One, Cathy receives a call which she thinks is a heavy breather. She tells him to get lost, but Agnes races through saying "No, wait! It might be your Uncle Terry, his asthma's very bad!". As Agnes only has the one sibling, Dolly, it is assumed that Terry is Redser's brother, and Grandad's other son.

The book characters

Frankie Brown

Francis "Frankie" Brown was (originally) the second child in the Brown family.

Frankie was the problem child; he was always getting into fights and bunking off school. However, at the end of the book The Chisellers, Frankie was gone and had taken everything, including Mark's new businessman's outfit. The family agreed to never speak of him again.

In an epilogue of the same book, Frankie was found dead. A young police constable walking his beat accidentally discovered the body of Frankie Brown beneath sheets of newspaper in an alley at the edge of Chelsea, on a freezing November night. The young man's body lay frozen in a foetal position. An autopsy revealed several facts, including: Frankie had died of hypothermia, that he was a long-time drug abuser, and that he had probably not eaten for at least three days. However, there was one secret the autopsy could not extract: For the last eight years of his life, Francis Brown had lived under the name of Ben Daly. Before burning the dead man's clothes, an assistant of the coroner's office went through the pockets in search of anything that might be valuable. They were empty but for a dirty, crumpled envelope upon which was written ‘Dublin Papers’.

Frankie has not appeared in the BBC series, but could be the unseen sixth child that is mentioned in the show.

Simon Brown

Simon Brown is (originally) the fifth son of the Brown family, the one Agnes is referring to when she says she had twins.

Simon appeared in the books and in the original television series in Dat place next to England. He works as a hospital porter and appears at Dermot and Maria's wedding. He speaks with a stutter and has a hearing aid in his right ear. In the books, he is Dermot's twin brother. Agnes mentions her "water"s" broke" in S1E5

Simon has not appeared in the BBC series, but could be the unseen sixth child that is mentioned in the show. However, since he was originally portrayed by Danny O'Carroll (now Buster Brady), he would have to be recast.

The McGoogan Family

Winnie McGoogan

Winifred "Winnie" McGoogan is the dim-witted best friend of Agnes Brown.

Winnie lives next door to the Brown family, and is Agnes' lifelong friend. The pair frequently have tea together at the Brown home, or have drinks at Foley's, discussing their families and their shortcomings. Winnie is constantly made fun of or fooled by Agnes; however, she remains oblivious and Agnes does in fact deeply care for her. When Winnie and her family inherit a house, Agnes is sad and asks Winnie not to move; she agrees. Winnie often takes things such as jokes too seriously, leading to hilarious double-entendres. She once asked Mr. Foley for a quickie – she had misread the menu which said quiche.

She admitted in an episode that her aunt emigrated to America and never heard from ever again, not even from a letter.

In the episode "Orange Is The New Mammy", Winnie's star sign is revealed to be Libra, for those who are born between September 23 to October 23.

Winnie is portrayed by O'Carroll's real-life sister, Eilish O'Carroll.

Jacko McGoogan

Jacko McGoogan is the constantly-hospitalised husband of Winnie, and the father of Sharon McGoogan.

Jacko is an unseen character, but he has a brother, Willy, who dies, making him the last of the McGoogans, and he inherits the family home from him. Winnie thinks that is ideal; the house is right next door to the hospital. However, the two do not move after Agnes requests that they don't. He is an almost-permanent fixture at the hospital, as he is severely accident-prone.

Sharon McGoogan

Sharon McGoogan is the promiscuous daughter of Jacko and Winnie McGoogan.

Sharon, a barmaid at Foley's Pub, loves to shout. Her loud voice has caught the attention of many people when silence is needed or when she wants to talk. She is desperate for a boyfriend (a long-running gag is that she sleeps with most of the married men in Finglas); one Valentine's Day, she held up a paper bag in Foley's and shouted that whoever guessed right would be able to have sex with her. When one man shouted that it was a giraffe, Sharon shrugged and said that it was close enough. The man sat down, not as eager. Agnes hints that Sharon has had many affairs with married men. According to Winnie, Sharon is quite intelligent and gifted, to which even Agnes agrees as she speaks four languages, and feels she is wasting her talents working at Foley's.

Sharon is portrayed by O'Carroll's real-life sister-in-law, Fiona Gibney, the real-life sister of Jennifer Gibney (Cathy Brown). Fiona is also one of the producers of the series, working for O'Carroll's own production company BOC-PIX.

Cathy's boyfriends

Mick O'Leary

Detective Michael "Mick, Mick The Dick" O'Leary is the former boyfriend of Cathy Brown.

Mick first appears in the episode Mammy's Merchandise in Series 1 and appeared in the first two episodes of Series 2 until the episode "Mammy's Coming!" when Maria Brown reveals that he is married and Cathy breaks up with him.

He is not seen again until Series 3 in the episode "Mammy?" when he returns on Cathy's doorstep and explains that he was divorced but Cathy and Agnes never gave him the chance to explain. The pair reunite but it doesn't last long as, in the New Years' episode "Who's A Pretty Mammy?", Mick says he has to go on a job with work. This makes Cathy suspicious and she learns that he is seeing another woman. It is revealed that Cathy tipped them off at Customs as drug smugglers to get back at Mick.

Professor Thomas Clowne

Professor Thomas Clowne is the former boyfriend of Cathy Brown. According to Cathy, his surname is pronounced "Cloon" but Agnes insists on pronouncing it "Clown".

Thomas first appears in the episode "iMammy (Batteries Not Included)" in Series 2 and appeared in two episodes of Series 2 ("SuperMammy" and "Mammy's Going") he is keen to interview Agnes for a book but she ends up making him talk about his mother not liking him.

His last appearance is in Series 3 in the episode "Mammy's Inflation", where he asks Cathy to look after his dog for a year whilst he went to a university in America. As Cathy was expecting a marriage proposal she is angry that he wants her to mind his dog and leaves him.

Thomas is also a cousin of Maria as mentioned in the original series and live tour, although in the BBC series, it appeared that they hadn't met.

Gaston

Gaston (or Crouton, as Agnes calls him) is a former boyfriend of Cathy, he is French, very antisocial, and extremely dominant of Cathy. One good example of this is when he was calling Sharon "Servant Woman" and barking orders at Cathy constantly. Sharon stated that his personality had nothing to do with him being French as she has met many nice Frenchmen before. Agnes describes him as having "the personality of a speed bump". He calls Cathy 'Kitty' every time he addresses her, which annoys Agnes; it annoys her even more when he announces to Cathy that her family is disgraceful and that he will not put up with their camaraderie anymore, and even more so when he says that Agnes is "lower class than an Olive Farmer's Concubine". This prompts Agnes to headbutt him, which annoys him to the point where he calls her "a camel's scrotum", which prompts Cathy to kick him in the groin area and dump him.

The other characters

Buster Brady

Buster Brady is the breakout character in the show and Dermot's criminal best friend.

Buster almost never budges from his regular outfit, consisting of a baseball cap, a jacket (he wears three or four different jackets), tracksuit bottoms, and white trainers, exceptions including when he wore his Best Man's suit for Dermot and Maria's wedding, although he was still wearing his cap and trainers, and when he played the angel in the Nativity in The Virgin Mammy for which he wore a white cap. Buster's jacket and trousers both have security tags attached, implying they are stolen, and he almost never wears his cap backwards, except only briefly in series 3 episode 6 "Mammy Swings!" when he tried to get a sneak peek at Agnes's new kitchen.

Buster often came up with scams and wheezes to earn money or to gain something for his own benefit, often roping Dermot in as an accomplice. He eventually gave it up and now works alongside Dermot promoting. He is very much disliked by Mrs Brown who sees him as a bad influence on Dermot; however in the later series she occasionally warms to him, such as when she lets him stay for a family Christmas dinner as he had no close family of his own to spend it with, and again at New Year. She also recognises that he is genuinely Dermot's friend and cares about Dermot. Agnes states this when Maria will not allow him to be Dermot's best man.
Buster himself seems very fond of Mrs Brown, seemingly oblivious to her dislike for him.

Buster is somewhat unintelligent, and frequently says stupid or irritating things with little regard for how others will react. However, he has on several occasions displayed a certain amount of cunning; for example, when he and Dermot were competing for a contract against another promotion company, Buster sabotaged their rivals by stealing their boxes of flyers and replacing them with Dermot and Buster's flyers, ultimately resulting in Dermot and Buster being awarded the contract.

It is unknown if Buster is related to Sadie Brady, at whose party Agnes and Redser met. In "Mammy's Widow Memories", Buster said that his birth year is 1988 which would make him either 34 or 35, as of now.

Buster is in love with Cathy, as shown in several episodes; this is normally played for laughs with him either being inappropriate or outright rejected. However, in the episode "Mammy's Gamble", he learned that Cathy was planning to attempt to conceive via artificial insemination and offered to marry her to give her a child, and a father for the child, saying he'd always loved her. Cathy was actually touched and whilst she said no and that she didn't love him, she said it was the weirdest and sweetest proposal she'd ever had.

In "Mammy's Hotel", Buster meets his son Blister.

Buster is portrayed by O'Carroll's real-life son, Danny O'Carroll, and is the real-life husband of Amanda Woods (Betty Brown) and father of Jamie (Bono Brown) and Blake O'Carroll (Blister Brady).

Hillary Nicholson

Hillary Nicholson (née Sheridan) is the snobbish mother of Maria and the maternal grandmother of the Brown triplets.

Despite her rich background, her great-grandfather made a living by pushing a cart of dead dogs around the streets. Bar Dermot, Hillary looks down on the Brown family at first but is gradually getting used to them and their surroundings. She is very protective of her daughter, and when planning Dermot and Maria's wedding, thinks of relocating the ceremony to Italy. However, she changes her mind when Agnes reminds her that her father, John, was the vicar at St. Jarleth's Church – and he hasn't been seen since the money from the collection disappeared. Hillary may seem snobbish and acts like she couldn't care less, but deep down she can be kind and caring.

Dr. Flynn

Dr. Flynn is Finglas' resident doctor.

Dr. Flynn usually appears in the Brown household attending to Grandad. He is shown to be very capable in his job, despite Agnes often interfering when he is treating Grandad. He also gave Agnes her wish to have Grandad tested for mental problems, for him to be put in a home while she goes to the Galway Races.

Dr. Flynn is shown to have a minor romantic interest in Cathy. He also became self-appointed Head Judge of the judging panel of Father Damien's Christmas house decorating competition, and abused his position by giving the prize (two tickets to go see the Finglas Warriors football team in the finals) to his aunt, Sheila.

Barbara

Barbara (played by Emily Regan) is a minor recurring character in the show. Although she appears several times throughout the series, mostly in Foley's, she doesn't actually speak until New Mammy, where she drops by the Brown household to check on Rory after he has an almighty bust-up with Dino and is feeling depressed. She makes some negative comments about Dino, calling him a "bitchy diva", before she realizes Dino is behind her and he tells her he has "a new sweeping brush for [her] to try out".

Barbara works alongside Rory and Dino at the Wash & Blow hair salon, but aside from her occupation, no other facts are known about her except that in New Mammy, it is revealed she is a trainee.

In Mrs Brown's Boys D'Movie, Barbara plays her usual background, mostly non-talking role for the most part, but she only has two lines in the whole movie, and they are both spoken in the scene where she and Dino are preparing Rory for his failed swim across the Channel; first, Barbara compliments Rory for his bravery whilst rubbing sun cream on his chest before Dino moves her hand and tells her he'll handle it to which Barbara simply responds "Fine". She has no dialogue for the rest of the movie.

Barbara is played by Emily Regan, who is the real-life wife of Paddy Houlihan (Dermot Brown).

Father Quinn

Father Quinn is the former priest of the local parish in Finglas.

Father Quinn is first seen when Agnes and Winnie crash the funeral party of Paddy Murphy, believing that it's where Maria's hen party is. He comforts Murphy's widow as Agnes and Winnie leave embarrassed. He begins to lose faith and turns to alcohol when a group of Mormons begin converting locals. In 2012, he leaves Finglas to go to rehab, at which point, Father Damien replaces him. After returning from rehab, he is quick to drink again after having seen Agnes again, who offers him a bottle, together with an incident involving Dermot's mobile phone, which she believes is stolen and hiding it in her bloomers; unfortunately, Buster rings it, causing Agnes to have an orgasm. He leaves the series and returns to rehab, where he is presumed to be currently.

Father Damien

Father Damien is the current priest of the local parish in Finglas.

Father Damien is first seen when Hillary introduces him to Agnes after he comes to Finglas to replace Father Quinn in the first of the two 2012 Christmas Specials. He is strong to protest against Agnes' play version of the Nativity. However, he gives in and gets permission from the Bishop once Agnes gets him to make amends with his own mother over the phone. He baptizes the Brown triplets and later visits Agnes, but accidentally causes her to act-up after he accidentally says one of the hypnosis words that turns her into a stripper (as the hypnotist at the baptism party didn't completely remove the hypnosis from her). When Rory and Dino are getting married, he tells Agnes (despite her protests) that he cannot bless them as the Church is against same-sex marriage. But he later shows up at the Brown house to celebrate their marriage as he personally is happy to celebrate all forms of love.

Father Damien also appears in All Round to Mrs Brown's, where he along with Trevor, hosts a segment called "Thought for the Day". In a rather marked contrast to his series self, Father Damien is shown here to be rather childish, acting like a child, often providing non-sequiturs and rather humorous lines to the segment, with Trevor serving as the "only straight man" in the act.

Father Damien has a friendship with Trevor, it all started since they met back in 2012 on the show.

Father Damien is portrayed by Conor Moloney.

Mr. Foley

Mr. Foley is the landlord of Foley's Pub.

Mr. Foley appears mostly in unspeaking roles behind the bar, but has spoken occasionally. In the original series, he was talking to a drunk Sharon and mentioned his wife had died. During a conversation with Agnes, he mentions his three children Nicole, Josh and Oliver. Besides this, little is known about his private life.

Father McBride

Father McBride is a priest who appeared in the 2013 New Year Special, "Who's a Pretty Mammy?" He encourages Agnes to take care of Lulu, a pet parrot that belonged to the late Mary Sheridan, sister to Hillary Nicholson and aunt to Maria. Later, he comes to blows with Agnes over the issue of whether Bono will be attending the notorious local school, St Stephen's. Mark and Betty want Bono to go to school outside the parish, and Agnes, fearful of Bono getting bullied if he goes to St Stephen's, agrees with them, but Father McBride refuses to sign the form to allow it to happen, saying that too many good children are leaving the parish. However, Lulu quickly makes him change his mind, after she says "Is it a bird? Is it a plane? Or is it Father McBride?", "Who's for a ride on Father McBride?" and "Ooh, that's a big one!". Fearful of his reputation, Father McBride asks to take care of Lulu. Agnes agrees, but only if he will sign the form; he reluctantly agrees.

Father McBride reappears in the movie, officiating at the funeral for Mary Moccasin. After a four-year absence from the screen, McBride returned, in the 2018 Christmas special "Exotic Mammy", as one of the three judges, alongside Hillary Nicholson and Dr. Flynn, in Father Damien's Christmas house decorating competition. Here, he is mentioned as being the priest of another parish, and has a considerably friendlier personality than he did in "Who's a Pretty Mammy?"

Blister Brady

Blister Brady is the son of Buster Brady.

Blister first appeared in the 2019 New Year special "Mammy's Motel" where Buster discovers his existence. Later on in the episode, Cathy and Maria work out that Buster isn't his biological father, but when they confront Buster over the issue, they haven't the heart to tell him and instead say that "he couldn't have a better father than you".

He reappeared in the 2020 New Year special "Orange Is The New Mammy".

Blister is shown to have a similar dress sense to his father.

He is portrayed by Blake O'Carroll, the real-life son of Danny O'Carroll (Buster Brady) and Amanda Woods (Betty Brown), the brother of Jamie O'Carroll (Bono Brown) and grandson of Brendan O'Carroll.

References

Mrs. Brown's Boys
Fictional families
Television characters introduced in 1992
Television characters introduced in 2011